Leunig is a surname. Notable people with the surname include:

Mary Leunig (born 1950), Australian visual artist
Michael Leunig (born 1945), Australian cartoonist, poet, artist, philosopher, and cultural commentator
Tim Leunig (born 1971), British economist